Transformers is an American comic book series that is mostly written by Brian Ruckley and was initially published twice-monthly by IDW Publishing. Based upon the Transformers franchise by Hasbro and Takara-Tomy, this series is a reboot of the previous comic book series that started with The Transformers: Infiltration in 2005 and concluded with Transformers: Unicron in 2018, taking place in a new continuity that is separate from the Hasbro Comic Book Universe.

The series debuted on March 13, 2019 and concluded on June 29, 2022 following the announcement of the Transformers comic book license leaving IDW by the end of the year.

Premise 
The story is set a long time ago, when Cybertron was a commerce hub across the galaxy during its age of peace. But everything gets turned upside down when a series of murders sets a chain of events that brings the inevitable war between the Autobots and Decepticons.

Production history

Background 
Following the bankruptcy and closure of Dreamwave Productions in January 2005, IDW Publishing acquired the Transformers comic book license in May and hired veteran writer Simon Furman to craft a rebooted continuity based on the Generation 1 toyline.

IDW's first Transformers title, set in its own continuity, was The Transformers: Infiltration, which was previewed with a #0 in October and formally launched with #1 in January 2006.

After having acquired the comic book licence of various other Hasbro properties throughout the years—such as G.I. Joe, Action Man, Rom, M.A.S.K., and Micronauts—IDW announced the Hasbro Reconstruction campaign in January 2016; a launch meant to converge these franchises in the same continuity, starting with the crossover events Revolution and First Strike.

In April 2018, it was announced that this shared continuity, the Hasbro Comic Book Universe (HCBU), would end with Transformers: Unicron in November.

Development 
Transformers was first announced by IDW Publishing on December 18, 2018. The title is written by Brian Ruckley, and was initially illustrated by Angel Hernandez and Cachét Whitman (replacing Ron Joseph), and started publishing issues twice-monthly on March 13, 2019. Ruckley described the writing opportunity as a "privilege", and stated that the title would be a great opportunity for new readers to familiarize themselves with the universe and characters of the Transformers franchise, which he describes as of the "biggest [and] best that science fiction has to offer".

In February 2022, IDW announced to pass the Transformers comic book license by the end of the year.

The series concluded on June 29, 2022 with a one-shot issue titled Transformers: Fate of Cybertron.

Expanded material 
 Transformers: Galaxies (2019–2020)
 Transformers: Escape (2020–2021)
 Wreckers: Tread & Circuits (2021–2022)
 Transformers: War's End (2022)

Issues

Reception

Collected editions

Trade paperback

Other

References

Notes

Footnotes 

IDW Publishing titles
Comic book reboots
2019 comics debuts
Transformers comics
Comic books suspended due to the COVID-19 pandemic